Caswell  may refer to:

Places

United Kingdom
Caswell, Swansea, a village in Wales
Caswell Bay, nearby
Caswell, Northamptonshire, a lost settlement and technology park in England

United States
Caswell, Maine, a town
Caswell Memorial State Park, California
Caswell County, North Carolina
Caswell, Wisconsin, a town
Caswell Air Force Station, Maine
Fort Watauga, more properly Fort Caswell, an American Revolutionary War fort in what is now Tennessee

People 
Caswell (surname), a list of people with the surname
Caswell J. Crebs (1912–1988), American jurist
Caswell Silver (1916–1988), American geologist and entrepreneur

Other uses
, American amphibious military cargo ship
ST Caswell, British tugboat
Caswell Developmental Center for mentally retarded adults, in North Carolina
House Caswell, a noble family in the A Song of Ice and Fire novels

See also
Caswell House (disambiguation)
Caswell Public Library (Former), Harrison, Maine, on the National Register of Historic Places
Caswell-Massey, personal care product company and apothecary shop founded in 1752 in Rhode Island